{{DISPLAYTITLE:Zeta1 Lyrae}}

Zeta1 Lyrae, Latinized from ζ1 Lyrae, is a binary star in the northern constellation of Lyra. Based upon an annual parallax shift of 20.89 mas as seen from Earth, the pair are located about 156 light years from the Sun. It is visible to the naked eye with an apparent visual magnitude of 4.37.

Observational history

ζ1 Lyrae was discovered to be a spectroscopic binary by William Wallace Campbell and Heber Doust Curtis in 1905 from photographic plates taken at the Lick Observatory between 1902 and 1904. The first orbit was calculated by Frank Craig Jordan of Allegheny Observatory in 1910 with results in good agreement with the most recent orbit.

Several other faint stars within about an arc-minute have been listed as companions, but none are physically associated with ζ1 Lyrae.

Binary system
This is a single-lined spectroscopic binary system with an orbital period of 4.3 days and a nearly circular orbit with an eccentricity of 0.01. The primary, component A, is an Am star with a stellar classification of kA5hF0mF2. This complex notation indicates that the spectral type determined solely from the calcium K line would be A5, the spectral type determined from other metallic lines would be F2, and the type determined from hydrogen lines would be F0.

Variability
ζ1 Lyrae appears to be slightly variable, with a frequency of 0.65256 cycles per day and an amplitude of 0.0032 in magnitude. The star has an estimated 2.36 times the mass of the Sun and around 2.5 times the Sun's radius.

References

Am stars
Lyra (constellation)
Lyrae, Zeta1
Lyrae, 06
173648
091971
7056
Spectroscopic binaries
Durchmusterung objects